The Turkey Women's National Wheelchair Basketball Team is the wheelchair basketball side that represents Turkey in international competitions for women.

The national team ranked sixth at the Women's European Wheelchair Basketball Championship held on June 28-July 8, 2013 in Frankfurt, Germany after losing to Spain with 39–59 in the play-offs.

Competitions

Current roster
Team roster at the 2017 IWBF Women's European Championship:

European Wheelchair Basketball Championship

See also
 Turkey men's national wheelchair basketball team

References

National women's wheelchair basketball teams
Wheelchair basketball
National women's
Wheelchair basketball